Julie Marie von Haefen (born February 4, 1971) is a Democratic member of the North Carolina House of Representatives, who has represented the State's 36th district (including constituents in Southern Wake County) since 2019.

Career
Haefen unseated longtime incumbent Nelson Dollar in the 2018 general election. von Haefen won with 49 percent of the vote to 48 percent for Dollar. In 2020, von Haefen defeated her Republican opponent, Kim Coley, winning 53.2 percent of the vote while Coley received 43.1 percent.

Electoral history

2020

2018

Committee assignments

2021-2022 Session
Appropriations 
Appropriations - General Government 
Homeland Security, Military, and Veterans Affairs 
Local Government 
State Government

2019-2020 Session
Homeland Security, Military, and Veterans Affairs 
Education - Community Colleges 
Finance 
State and Local Government

References

Living people
1971 births
People from West Chester, Butler County, Ohio
People from Apex, North Carolina
Ohio University alumni
Case Western Reserve University alumni
North Carolina lawyers
Democratic Party members of the North Carolina House of Representatives
21st-century American politicians
21st-century American women politicians
Women state legislators in North Carolina